James F. Dill is an American entomologist, politician and professor from Maine. A Democrat, Dill serves Maine House of Representatives District 26, comprising Bradley, the Penobscot Nation Voting District, and Old Town. Dill was first elected to the Maine Legislature in 2010 when he represented Maine House District 14 for two terms before running for the Senate District 5 in 2014. He completed his fourth term in the Maine Senate in 2022. Dill works as the pest management specialist for the University of Maine Cooperative Extension and is a professor in the School of Biological Sciences at the University of Maine. He is considered one of the foremost experts on insect pests in Maine and one of the pioneers of integrated pest management (IPM) in the state.

Education & career
Dill received both a Bachelor of Science and a Master of Science in entomology from the University of Maine and a PhD in entomology from Purdue University in 1979. He has worked as a pest management specialist for the University of Maine Extension since 1981. Dill coordinates the Extension Diagnostic and Research Laboratory, the Integrated Pest Management, and the Pesticide Safety Education programs. He also serves as a legislative and congressional resource liaison for the university.

Dill also serves as the state of Maine's first Integrated pest management coordinator. In 2021, he was awarded the University of Maine Presidential Public Engagement Award.

Maine Legislature

Dill was first elected to the Maine House of Representatives in 2010. He served two terms tin the House before running for Senate District 5 in 2014. Dill is currently serving his fourth term in the Maine Senate.

Personal life
Dill lives in Old Town, Maine where he has served on the boards of both the Regional School District 34 and Maine Vocational Region #4 since 2003. Dill is a member of the Orono-Old Town Kiwanis. He has been treated for Lyme disease twice.

Electoral history

References

Notes

External links
Entomologist & Maine State Senator Jim Dill on Your Maine

Year of birth missing (living people)
Living people
People from Old Town, Maine
School board members in Maine
Democratic Party members of the Maine House of Representatives
Purdue University College of Agriculture alumni
University of Maine alumni
University of Maine faculty
American entomologists
21st-century American politicians